Galații Bistriței is a commune in Bistrița-Năsăud County, Transylvania, Romania. It is composed of five villages: Albeștii Bistriței (formerly Ferihaza), Dipșa, Galații Bistriței, Herina and Tonciu.

At the 2011 census, 80.4% of inhabitants were Romanians, 9.3% Hungarians and 8.7% Roma.

Dipșa village features a church originally completed in 1489. It was founded by Transylvanian Saxons as a Catholic and later Lutheran church, and is now Romanian Orthodox, dedicated to Saint Demetrius of Thessaloniki. It is known as the “sow’s church” because, according to legend, a sow discovered a bucket full of gold coins that were used to build the church.

References

Communes in Bistrița-Năsăud County
Localities in Transylvania